The Rugby Football League Women's Super League (known as the Betfred Women's Super League due to sponsorship) is the elite women's rugby league club competition in England. Originally competed between four teams in the 2017 season, the league has developed with the 2023 season being contested by 12 teams playing home and away  against each other in two groups with subsequent play-offs and Grand Final.

History

2014–2016: Background

The first women's competition that was set up was the Women's Rugby League Championship, set up in 2014. It was mostly made up of community clubs with only Hunslet, Featherstone Rovers and Rochdale Hornets being professional clubs with a women's team. The league had a very low profile and only ran for three years until the Women's Super League was formed in 2017.

2017–2019: Foundations
To give the sport a bigger profile, the Super League name used by the men's game was adopted in 2017. The new league was still made up of community clubs but more professional clubs entered a women's team, notably Bradford Bulls took over the Bradford Thunderbirds team. The four founding clubs were Bradford Bulls, Castleford Tigers, Featherstone Rovers and Thatto Heath Crusaders.

The league expanded the following year with Leeds, York and Wigan joining while St. Helens took over from Thatto Heath Crusaders. The league was expanded again to eight clubs for 2019 with the addition of Wakefield Trinity Ladies.

2020–2021: Expansion
The league continued to grow with Warrington Wolves and Huddersfield Giants joining from the Championship for the 2020 season. The structure was also slightly changed with the addition of the Shield Final for the bottom six clubs to play for.

Clubs

Season structure
Until 2019 the league was played with each team playing all the others home and away. At the end of the regular season, the top four teams played two semi-finals with the winners meeting in the grand final.

For 2021 a new structure was introduced. The ten teams play each other once, home or away over nine rounds. The top five then go into a play-off section where each team plays the others once more. The team finishing top of this play-off section wins the League Leaders Shield. The top four in the play-offs then meet in two semi-finals with the winners of these two game competing in the Grand Final.

The bottom five teams in the regular season enter the Shield competition which follows an identical format to the play-offs, where the winners of the two semi-finals meet in the Shield final.

2022 saw further changes with the Super League split into two sections; group 1 and group 2. This decision was made to introduce more competitive fixtures as the 2021 season drew criticism for the number of very one-sided matches. 

The same format was retained for 2023 but from 2024 the league will be reduced to eight clubs as part of a new integrated structure for the women's game in the United Kingdom.

Final venues
Three venues have so far hosted the Grand Final. In 2021 the Grand final and the Shield final were played as a double-header.

Champions

Results

The Double

In rugby league, the term 'the Double' is referring to the achievement of a club that wins the top division and Challenge Cup in the same season.

The Treble

The Treble refers to the team who wins all three domestic honours on offer during the season; Grand Final, League Leaders' Shield and Challenge Cup. The treble has been achieved thrice.

Awards

League Leaders
The League Leaders is awarded to the team finishing the regular season top of Super League.

Woman of Steel award
The Woman of Steel is an annual award for the best player of the season in Super League. It was formed in 2018 to become a part of the Man of Steel Awards at the end of the men's Super League season.

Sponsorship
In August 2019 a sponsorship deal with bookmakers Betfred was announced to start immediately and which will run until the end of the 2021 season (concurrent with Betfred's sponsorship of Super League).

See also

RFL Women's Rugby League
RFL Women's Super League South
Women's Rugby League Conference
NRL Women's Premiership
NZRL Women's National Tournament

Notes

References

External links

 
Super League
Women's
Women's rugby league competitions in England
2017 establishments in England
Sports leagues established in 2017
Rugby league
Professional sports leagues in the United Kingdom